Lucas Rossi (born 21 December 1994) is an Argentine slalom canoeist who has competed at the international level since 2012.

In 2019, he won the silver medal in the men's K1 event at the Pan American Games held in Lima, Peru. Four years earlier, in 2015, he won the bronze medal in the C2 event at the Pan American Games in Toronto, Canada.

He competed in the K1 event at the delayed 2020 Summer Olympics in Tokyo, where he finished 21st after being eliminated in the heats.

His older brother Sebastián is also a slalom canoeist.

References

External links 
 

Living people
1994 births
Argentine male canoeists
Pan American Games medalists in canoeing
Pan American Games silver medalists for Argentina
Pan American Games bronze medalists for Argentina
Canoeists at the 2015 Pan American Games
Canoeists at the 2019 Pan American Games
Medalists at the 2015 Pan American Games
Medalists at the 2019 Pan American Games
Canoeists at the 2020 Summer Olympics
Olympic canoeists of Argentina
Sportspeople from Buenos Aires Province
20th-century Argentine people
21st-century Argentine people